Aerolink Uganda is a privately owned airline in Uganda, licensed by the Uganda Civil Aviation Authority with an air operator's certificate. It specializes in transporting tourists to Uganda's National Parks, saving their time and allowing them to see more.

Location
The headquarters of Aerolink Uganda are located inside Entebbe International Airport, Uganda's largest civilian airport. The geographical coordinates of the airline's headquarters are: 0°02'40.0"N, 32°26'34.0"E (Latitude:0.044444; Longitude:32.442778).

Overview
Aerolink Uganda, whose owners are based in neighboring Kenya, was established in 2012. The airline flies tourists between Entebbe and Uganda's national parks. Daily scheduled flights are available to Kisoro Airport, Kihihi Airstrip, Kasese Airport, and Mweya Airport, all in the Western Region of Uganda. Flights are available three days a week, with minimum passenger numbers to airfields Murchison Falls National Park and Kidepo Valley National Park, both in the Northern Region of Uganda.

Destinations
From its hub in Entebbe International Airport, the company operates scheduled services to destinations within East Africa. Following is a list of destinations that Aerolink Uganda serves, as of May 2019.

Flight scheduling
The flight schedule of the airline is given in detail at the website of the Uganda Wildlife Authority.

Affiliations
Aerolink Uganda is affiliated and shares common ownership with Air Kenya and Regional Air of Tanzania.

Fleet
As of May 2019, Aerolink Uganda maintained the following aircraft in service.

See also

 Airlines of Africa 
 List of airlines of Uganda

References

External links
 Website of Aerolink Uganda
 Meet Uganda Airlines Pilots, as of 29 April 2019

Airlines of Uganda
Airlines established in 2012
Wakiso District
Organisations based in Entebbe
2012 establishments in Uganda